Stephanie Rehe (born November 5, 1969) is a retired American tennis player.

She played on the WTA Tour between 1985 and 1993, won five singles titles and two doubles titles, and reached a career-high singles ranking of No. 10, in March 1989.

Career
A successful amateur player, Rehe was ranked No. 1 in every age group as a junior (12s, 14s, 16s, 18s). She was the first player to receive a dual No. 1 ranking in 14s and 16s (1983).

At the age of 13 years and one month, Rehe was in 1982 the youngest player to compete in a WTA Tour event. In 1983, she became the youngest player to be ranked on the WTA computer, coming on at 13 years and two months in January, two months younger than Steffi Graf. She won her first tournament in 1985 in the Virginia Slims of Utah not dropping a set along the way; as well as upsetting Camille Benjamin in the final. She defeated Michelle Torres, Carling Bassett, and Gabriela Sabatini to capture her first major Virginia Slims Series event at the Florida Federal Open in Tampa in November 1985. Rehe defeated Lisa Bonder, and pushed Steffi Graf to three sets in the quarterfinals at Fort Lauderdale in 1985. In 1986, she received the Most Impressive Newcomer Award of the WTA and was voted Rookie of the Year by Tennis Magazine.

She reached a career-high ranking of world No. 10 on March 13, 1989. However, she left the tour that year due to a back injury, which required surgery and extensive rehabilitation. She returned to the tour in August 1990 in San Diego and was WTA awarded Comeback Player of the Year in 1991. She retired permanently in 1993.

She won five singles titles and two doubles titles, and had career wins over Pam Shriver, Gabriela Sabatini, Claudia Kohde-Kilsch, Zina Garrison, Mary Joe Fernandez, and Jo Durie. Her best singles performances in Grand Slam events included fourth rounds at the US Open in 1986 and 1988, and at the French Open in 1987.

WTA career finals

Singles: 7 (5 titles, 2 runner-ups)

Doubles: 4 (2 titles, 2 runner-ups)

Grand Slam performance timeline

Singles

References

External links
 
 

1969 births
Living people
American female tennis players
People from Fontana, California
American people of German descent
Tennis people from California
Wimbledon junior champions
Grand Slam (tennis) champions in girls' doubles
Sportspeople from Oceanside, California
21st-century American women